Angela Bourke (former married name Partridge) (1952) is an Irish author, historian and academic who focuses on Irish oral tradition and literature in her books, lectures, and broadcasting.

Biography
Bourke is a Dublin-born writer, oral historian and academic with an interest in the voice of women in folklore. Educated in University College Dublin with an MA in Celtic Studies she travelled to Université de Bretagne Occidentale in 1974. Bourke completed her doctorate in women's religious poetry in Irish folklore, also from University College Dublin. In the 1970s Bourke collected songs in Carna, Conemara. She was the first holder of Princess Grace Irish Library (Monaco) bursary for academic writers, Autumn 2002. She has travelled widely to other universities in Japan, Europe and the US as a guest and visiting professor, including Harvard University from 1992-93.  She is Professor of Irish-Language Studies and Head of modern Irish in UCD.

Bourke is a member of the Royal Irish Academy.

Awards
 The Frank O’Connor Award for Short Fiction, 1992
 The Irish Times Literature Prize for non-fiction in 2000 and American Conference for Irish Studies James S. Donnelly Prize, 2001 with The Burning of Bridget Cleary: A True Story

Selected works

Folklore studies and biography

 Caoineadh na dTrí Muire: Téama na Páise i bhfílocht bhéil na Gaeilge (Baile Átha Cliath: An Clóchomhar Tta, 1983)
 The Burning of Bridget Cleary: A True Story (London: Pimlico 1999)
 Maeve Brennan of the New Yorker (London: Jonathan Cape 2004)

Fiction

 By Salt Water (Dublin: New Island 1996)
 “Iníon Rí na Cathrach Deirge” (1989) 
 “Iníon Rí na Oileáin Dhorca (1991)

Miscellaneous

 ‘Working and Weeping: Women’s Oral Poetry in Irish and Scottish Gaelic Poetry’, in Women's Studies Working Papers, No. 7 (UCD Women's Studies Forum 1988)
 Fish stone water: Holy Wells of Ireland, by Anna Rackard, introduced by Angela Bourke (Cork: Atrium 2001)
 The Field Day Anthology of Irish Writing, vols iv and v: Irish Women's Writing and Traditions (2002)  ed.
 ‘Adventures with old things’, in The Dublin Review, 4 (Autumn 2001), pp. 5–13

References

Further reading
 Otherworldly Women and Neurotic Fairies: The Cultural Construction of Women in Angela Bourke's Writing; Tudor Balinisteanu; Irish University Review; Vol. 37, No. 2 (Autumn - Winter, 2007), pp. 492-516; Published by: Edinburgh University Press

External links 
Folklore council of Ireland
 Irish Writers online Biography
Irish Literature Exchange

1952 births
Living people
20th-century Irish women writers
20th-century Irish non-fiction writers
21st-century Irish women writers
Writers from Dublin (city)
Alumni of University College Dublin
Members of the Royal Irish Academy
21st-century Irish non-fiction writers